The Talon MHS-II was a short-lived Can-Am sports prototype racing car, built by Talon in 1977. Fitted with a 5-litre Chevrolet V8 engine, the car proved to be unsuccessful, as it never finished a race.

Racing history
The Talon MHS-II was built by Talon in 1977 for the Can-Am series. It used a 5-litre Chevrolet V8 engine, and was driven by Hunter Harris. It made its debut at the second race of the season, held at Laguna Seca Raceway; however, Harris retired the car after 32 laps, and was classified eleventh. Having missed the third race of the season, Harris returned for the next round, held at Road America; this time after 27 laps due to a broken gear, being classified in 16th. He would not compete again until the eighth round of the season, held at Sears Point; this time, the engine failed after 13 laps, forcing him to retire, and be classified 16th once more. Harris would then enter the next round, held at Riverside; this time, another mechanical problem caused him to retire after 31 laps, and resulted in him being classified 25th. The MHS-II was never raced again.

References

Can-Am cars
Sports prototypes
Mid-engined cars
Rear-wheel-drive vehicles